is a national highway connecting Nagoya and Nagano in Japan.

Route data
Length: 258.9 km (165.5 mi)
Origin: Atsuta-ku, Nagoya, Nagoya (originates at junction with Route 1)
Terminus: Nagano City (ends at Junction with Route 18)
Major cities: Kasugai, Tajimi, Nakatsugawa, Shiojiri, Matsumoto, Azumino

History
4 December 1952 - Designation as First Class National Highway 19 (from Nagoya to Nagano, Nagano)
1 April 1965 - Designation as General National Highway 19 (from Nagoya to Nagano, Nagano)

Overlapping sections
From Atsuta, Nagoya (Atsuta Shrine South intersection) to Naka, Nagoya (Nichigin-mae intersection): Route 22
From Toki (Odomi intersection) to Mizunami (Yamanouchi intersection): Route 21
From Ena (Shoke intersection) to Sendambayashi, Nakatsugawa: Route 257
From Nakatsugawa (Iyasaka-bashi intersection) to Nagiso (Azuma-bashi intersection): Route 256
In Kiso Town, from Kiso-ohashi intersection to Hiyoshi-Ozawabara intersection: Route 361

Municipalities passed through
Aichi Prefecture
Nagoya - Kasuagai
Gifu Prefecture
Tajimi - Toki - Mizunami - Ena - Nakatsugawa
Nagano Prefecture
Nagiso - Okuwa - Agematsu - Kiso town - Kiso Vill - Shiojiri - Matsumoto - Azumino - Ikusaka - Ōmachi - Nagano - Shinsyūshinmachi - Nagano

Intersects with

Aichi Prefecture
Routes 1 and 247; at the origin, in Atsuta-ku, Nagoya
Route 22; from the origin to Naka-ku, Nagoya
Routes 41 and 153; at Higashi-ku, Nagoya
Route 155; at Kasugai City
Gifu Prefecture
Route 248; at Tajimi City
Route 21; from Toki City to Mizunami City
Route 418; at Ena City
Route 257; from Ena City to Nakatsugawa City
Route 363; at Nakatsugawa City
Route 256; from Nakatsugawa City to Nagiso Town
Nagano Prefecture
Route 361 at Kiso Town
Routes 20 and 153 at Shiojiri City
Routes 143, 147, 158 and 254 at Matsumoto City
Route 403 at Azumino City
Route 117 at Nagano City
Route 18 at the terminus, in Nagano City

Bypasses
 Kasugai Bypass
 Utsutsu Bypass
 Tajimi Bypass
 Toki Bypass
 Mizunami Bypass
 Ena Bypass
 Nakatsugawa Bypass
 Agematsu Bypass
 Matsumoto Bypass
 Naganominami Bypass

References

019
Roads in Aichi Prefecture
Roads in Gifu Prefecture
Roads in Nagano Prefecture